Two ships of the Royal Navy have been named HMS Explorer

 an experimental submarine launched in 1954 and scrapped in 1962
 a small patrol craft commissioned in 1986, still in active service

See also
 Royal Navy 
 , a number of motor vessels with this name

Royal Navy ship names